Sass Rigais (3,025 m) is a mountain of the northwestern Dolomites in South Tyrol, northern Italy. Along with the nearby Furchetta, which is exactly the same height and only 600m away, it is the highest peak of the Geisler group. Sass Rigais offers hikers one of few Dolomites' three-thousanders the entire crossing from one side of the mountain to the other. The Via ferrata Villnössersteig is categorized between a B and C difficulty and the trail Sass Rigais steig is rated C. A crucifix is located at the summit.

External links 
 Sass Rigais on Summitpost

Mountains of the Alps
Alpine three-thousanders
Mountains of South Tyrol
Dolomites